DXKI (1062 AM) is a radio station owned and operated by the Far East Broadcasting Company. The station's studio is located along National Highway, Brgy. Morales, Koronadal.

References

Radio stations established in 1964
Radio stations in South Cotabato
1964 establishments in the Philippines
Far East Broadcasting Company
Christian radio stations in the Philippines